Eischied is an American crime drama television series that aired on NBC from September 21, 1979, to July 1, 1980. It was based on the starring character from the 1978 miniseries To Kill a Cop, which was based on the 1976 novel by Robert Daley.

The show was broadcast in the United Kingdom under the title Chief of Detectives.  In West Germany the show ran in 1980 under the title Schauplatz New York ("Location: New York").

Synopsis 
The series stars Joe Don Baker as tough, brilliant, southern-bred New York City Police Department Chief of Detectives Earl Eischied.  His complimentary catchphrase was "Ya done good," which was usually directed at one of the younger detectives or officers in his command.  His pet cat was named "PC" (as in "police commissioner").  Eischied was tough and did not hesitate to work the streets with his detectives.  He used a Smith & Wesson Model 10 .38 Special, snub-nosed revolver, which he carried "old school" style, inside his waistband, concealed by his vest and/or suit jacket.  He was not afraid to bend the rules in pursuit of a case, but would never break the law.  His southern drawl concealed a sharp intellect and encyclopedic knowledge of criminology and police work.  Although Eischied was physically imposing, he had great empathy and compassion for victims of crime and others less fortunate.

NBC reran all 13 episodes of Eischied in its original Friday night time slot during the summer of 1983, almost four years after it had been cancelled.

Cast 
Joe Don Baker as Chief Earl Eischied
Alan Oppenheimer as Capt. Finnerty 
Suzanne Lederer as Carol Wright 
Alan Fudge as Dep. Kimbrough 
Eddie Egan as Ed Parks
Vincent Bufano as Rick Alessi

Episodes

References

External links 
 
 

1979 American television series debuts
1980 American television series endings
1970s American crime drama television series
1980s American crime drama television series
English-language television shows
Fictional portrayals of the New York City Police Department
Television shows set in New York City
NBC original programming
Television series based on American novels
Television series by Sony Pictures Television